Tunnels and bridges are an important part of the Faroese transportation network.

Tunnels

This list shows the Faroese tunnels, listed by age:

Bridges and causeways
This list shows the longest Faroese bridges and causeways, listed by age:

Tunnels under construction

Tunnels in preparation

Proposed tunnels

Operator
Public works authority Landsverk operates the national road network including all land-based tunnels. The four sub-sea tunnels have each their own state-owned company brought together under the daily management of Tunnil.fo, which administers the tolls. These are paid by drivers at select petrol stations, via number plate recognition. Reduced fares are available for vehicles with a subscription (in Faroese: hald). Tórshavn Municipality owns the Sandá Bridge. A 2022 poll suggested continued support for toll charges.

See also
 Transport in the Faroe Islands

References

External links
 Tunnil, the Operator of toll tunnels
 Landsverk, the operator of all other national highways

Faroe Islands
Tunnels
Tunnels